Claverack-Red Mills, commonly known as Claverack, is a census-designated place (CDP) in Columbia County, New York, United States. The population was 913 at the 2010 census.

The census region is in the western part of the town of Claverack and derives its name from the two hamlets of Claverack and Red Mills.

The community has a number of historic buildings, including the Harriet Phillips Bungalow. From 1779 to 1902, Claverack College operated in the village.

Geography
Claverack-Red Mills is located in the western part of the town of Claverack at  (42.225214, -73.721449). The center of Claverack hamlet is at the intersection of New York State Routes 9H, 23, and 23B. Routes 9H and 23 combined lead south  to U.S. Route 9 in the town of Livingston. From Red Mills, NY 217 leads northeast  to Philmont.

Claverack Creek, a tributary of the Hudson River, flows westward as the southern edge of the CDP, south of the centers of the two hamlets.

Demographics

As of the census of 2000, there were 1,061 people, 470 households, and 308 families residing in the CDP. The population density was 362.0 per square mile (139.8/km2). There were 510 housing units at an average density of 174.0/sq mi (67.2/km2). The racial makeup of the CDP was 97.74% White, 0.75% African American, 0.09% Native American, 0.38% from other races, and 1.04% from two or more races. Hispanic or Latino of any race were 0.94% of the population.

There were 470 households, out of which 24.3% had children under the age of 18 living with them, 54.3% were married couples living together, 9.1% had a female householder with no husband present, and 34.3% were non-families. 30.0% of all households were made up of individuals, and 14.9% had someone living alone who was 65 years of age or older. The average household size was 2.26 and the average family size was 2.79.

In the CDP, the population was spread out, with 18.9% under the age of 18, 4.9% from 18 to 24, 23.3% from 25 to 44, 29.5% from 45 to 64, and 23.5% who were 65 years of age or older. The median age was 47 years. For every 100 females, there were 98.7 males. For every 100 females age 18 and over, there were 92.6 males.

The median income for a household in the CDP was $49,476, and the median income for a family was $60,677. Males had a median income of $41,591 versus $32,222 for females. The per capita income for the CDP was $30,237. None of the families and 3.1% of the population were living below the poverty line, including no under eighteens and 7.1% of those over 64.

References

 
Census-designated places in New York (state)
Census-designated places in Columbia County, New York
Former county seats in New York (state)